Practical Joke (foaled April 15, 2014 in Kentucky) is a retired multiple Grade I-winning American Thoroughbred racehorse whose wins included the Hopeful, Champagne and H. Allen Jerkens Memorial Stakes.

Background
Practical Joke is a bay colt with a star and no other white markings who was bred in Kentucky by Whispering Oaks. He is from the fifth crop of foals by Into Mischief, a stakes winning son of Harlan's Holiday and out of Leslie's Lady, who later produced champion Beholder. Into Mischief originally stood for only $12,500, but his profile increased when he sired two-time Breeders' Cup Dirt Mile winner Goldencents. Practical Joke is the fourth foal out of the stakes placed mare Halo Humor, by Distorted Humor. He was sold twice as a yearling in 2015, first in the Keeneland January mixed sale for $135,000 and then at the Keeneland September sale for $240,000.

Racing career

2016: two-year-old season
Practical Joke started his career in a 6-furlong Maiden Special Weight at Saratoga on August 6. He was sent off as the 12/5 favorite ridden by Irad Ortiz Jr. Leaving the gate, he bumped with another horse and was near the back of the pack down the backstretch. He went wide on the turn and started to close quickly on the early leaders, then drew away in the stretch to win by 5 lengths.

He then entered the Hopeful Stakes on September 9 where he was the 2-1 second choice in a field of six behind Classic Empire. Ridden by José Ortiz, he settled at the back of the pack behind a slow early pace, then swung wide around the turn. In the stretch, he battled with Royal Copy and Pretty Boy Flash but inched away late in the final furlong to win by a neck. Ortiz said after the race, "He was running the whole way. He gave me a great turn of foot when I got him in the clear but the other two horses were in front and they kept fighting a little bit. As soon as he put a head in front, he kept going."

The win was particularly satisfying for trainer Chad Brown, a trainer with a good reputation with fillies and turf horses, but who had never won a Grade I race with a colt on the dirt. "It's really a dream come true", said Brown. "I'm just so happy. What a great moment for me and my staff... It's been a pleasure to train him. That first race I thought he ran well and his second time here he also came back to run a huge race."

Practical Joke's final prep for the Breeders' Cup Juvenile was the Champagne Stakes at Belmont Park on October 8. He was the 5-2 second choice behind Syndergaard at 9–5. Now ridden by Joel Rosario, he broke awkwardly and ducked in toward the rail, then settled into mid-pack. He made his move around the turn and in the stretch he got even with Syndergaard and dueled down to the wire to win a head bobbing finish by a nose in a time of 1:34.68. It was the fourth fastest Champagne Stakes in the history of the race. Rosario stated after the race, "He kind of broke awkward on the inside and I had to use him a little through the chute. He was looking around and it took him a little time to get back in the race but he was fine after that. They were going really fast up front but it looks like the more distance he gets to run into the better he gets. For a second when I got to the other horse (Syndergaard) he waited a little bit. He's still a young horse if anything but looks good going forward."

The Breeders' Cup Juvenile was held at Santa Anita race track on November 5. Practical Joke was one of several horses at 7-1 odds in a highly competitive field of thirteen that included Grade I winners Klimt (Del Mar Futurity), Gormley (FrontRunner) and Classic Empire (Breeders' Futurity). At the break, Practical Joke bumped with Not This Time, then settled into mid pack. On the far turn, he angled to the outside and pulled into third place but finished over seven lengths behind Classic Empire and Not This Time.

2017: three-year-old season
Practical Joke began the year as one of the top-ranked colts for the 2017 Kentucky Derby, although concerns were expressed about the lack of stamina influences in his pedigree. He made his first start of 2017 in the Fountain of Youth Stakes on March 4 at Gulfstream Park. After settling in the middle of the pack during the early running, Practical Joke moved to the lead around the far turn but was passed in the stretch by Gunnevera. Brown was happy with the performance, believing Practical Joke needed the race.

Practical Joke made his next start in the Blue Grass Stakes on April 8 at Keeneland racetrack. He made a sustained drive down the stretch and finished just three-quarters of a length behind longshot Irap, with highly regarded McCraken three lengths behind in third. Despite concerns over Practical Joke's stamina, Brown was cautiously optimistic about the colt's prospects in the Derby. "Maybe this is a year that we want to take a shot because we have a horse that has the points [earned in the 2017 Road to the Kentucky Derby], and he did sustain his run."

The Kentucky Derby was held on May 6 over a wet-fast track at Churchill Downs. Practical Joke drew post position 19 but Rosario was able to guide him over to the rail to save ground around the first turn. In the final turn, Practical Joke moved to the outside and made a strong run to advance to fourth in mid-stretch before tiring slightly and finishing fifth. Brown was pleased by the effort, saying, "He got a great trip from that post...He's a very fine racehorse. He just can't go that far. But he was fighting and trying."

Brown gave the colt a layoff then entered him in the Dwyer Stakes at Belmont Park on July 8 where he was made the 4-5 favorite. Practical Joke rated in fourth behind the early pacemakers, but was trapped on the inside as they entered the stretch. Swung wide by Rosario, he finally found racing room and quickly pulled away to win by two lengths. Brown was pleased. "He really ran well today. I certainly think it's the best race he's ever won."

On July 30, Practical Joke made his next start in the Haskell Invitational at Monmouth Park where he faced a high quality field that included old rival McCraken, Belmont Stakes runner-up Irish War Cry and Santa Anita Derby winner Girvin. After being bumped at the start, Practical Joke rated in the middle of the pack trailed by McCraken and Girvin. Turning into the stretch, McCraken made his move and opened a one-length lead while Practical Joke and Girvin started closing ground on the outside. In a photo finish, Girvin prevailed over McCraken by a nose with Practical Joke just half a length behind in third.

On August 26, Practical Joke started in the H. Allen Jerkens Memorial Stakes at Saratoga Race Course. He drew post 1 and again was ridden by Rosario. He broke well and settled towards the rear of the field, as Takaful set the pace. Rosario started asking Practical Joke to go around the final turn, and Practical Joke unleashed a sustained rally, winning by 1 1/4 lengths with a time of 1:21.96 for seven furlongs. With the win, Practical Joke earned the third grade one victory of his career. Brown stated after the race: "To cut back all the way to seven-eighths after a tough race in the Haskell, I'm so proud of this horse. It was his third race in seven weeks. He's our iron horse."

Practical Joke made his next start in the Breeders' Cup Dirt Mile at Del Mar on November 3. Unfortunately he drew the outside post position, a major disadvantage in a two-turn mile. He broke slowly and was angled sharply over to the rail to save ground on the first turn. Down the backstretch, he raced near the back of the field, then started to make up position around the second turn. With a quarter of a mile remaining, he was swung wide and closed down the stretch, finishing fourth.

Practical Joke's final start was in the Cigar Mile on December 2 at Aqueduct. He settled at the back of the pack, over 12 lengths behind a fast early pace. Around the far turn, he moved wide and circled the field to make up ground but was still finished well back in third  behind Sharp Azteca and Mind Your Biscuits. "It was hard to make up ground today on this track", commented Brown. "That said, the winner was very impressive, and I don't think it would have mattered how the track was playing; it looked like nobody was going to beat him today."

Statistics

Source: Equibase Charts

Retirement
After his win in the Allen Jerkens, it was announced that his breeding rights were purchased by Ashford Stud (a division of the international operation Coolmore Stud). He was retired after the Cigar Mile and his stud fee for 2018 was set at $30,000. In 2022 his stud fee was set at $35,000 and that year he had first offspring win a Grade I event in the United States when Chocalate Gelato who the Frizette Stakes at Aqueduct Racetrack.

Notable progeny
His major stakes winners include:
c = colt, f = filly, g = gelding''

Pedigree

Practical Joke is inbred 5 x 5 to Halo, meaning Halo appears twice in the fifth generation of Practical Joke's pedigree.

References

2014 racehorse births
Thoroughbred family A4
Racehorses bred in Kentucky
Racehorses trained in the United States